Jean-Baptiste Van Mons (11 November 1765 Brussels — 6 September 1842 Leuven) was a Belgian physicist, chemist, botanist, horticulturist and pomologist, and professor of chemistry and agronomy at Louvain (1817-1830). Van Mons carried out the first recorded selective breeding of the European Pear through cycles of seed propagation.

He was the most prolific pear breeder known, producing no fewer than 40 superior varieties over a 60-year period, including Bosc and D'Anjou pears. Van Mons readily shared his observations and plants, and developed effective ways of exporting cuttings and seedlings as far away as the United States. After his death his seed collection was acquired by Alexandre Bivort.

The French and Belgians were fanatical about pears, and spent an inordinate amount of time developing new varieties of pear with a buttery taste in the 18th century. A few Belgian varieties show this by having Beurré  in the name. Louis XIV doted on pears, his greatest fruit love after figs and, not surprisingly, many varieties were cultivated at Versailles by his gardener Jean-Baptiste de la Quintinie.

He was a founding member of the second Société des douze.

Works
1800 Pharmacopée Manuelle, (Bruxelles), 8vo.
1812 Grundsätze der Electricitätslehre zur Bestätigung der Franklin'schen Theorie - Marburg, Krieger
1812 French translation of Humphry Davy's  Elements of Chemical Philosophy, London: Johnson and Co., 1812
1819-21 Annales Generales des Sciences Physiques (6 vols) - Jean Baptiste Bory de Saint-Vincent, Pierre Auguste Joseph Drapiez, Jean Baptiste Van Mons 
1835-36 Abres fruitiers - L. Dusart, H. Vandenbroeck, Jean Baptiste Van Mons

References

External links

Fruit from Washington

1765 births
1842 deaths
Belgian chemists
Belgian horticulturists
Members of the French Academy of Sciences